The Exeter River is a  river located in Rockingham County in southeastern New Hampshire, United States.

It follows a winding course east and northeast to Exeter, where it becomes the Squamscott River, a tidal river leading north to Great Bay. There are falls and small dams at several locations along the river. A significant dam (Great Dam) that had long existed at the river's termination in Exeter was removed in the summer of 2016, restoring the river's flow to its natural state where it meets the Squamscott River.

The upper  of the river, from its headwaters to its confluence with Great Brook in Exeter, were designated into the NH Rivers Management and Protection Program in August 1995.

See also

List of rivers of New Hampshire

References

External links
Exeter Squamscott River Local Advisory Committee

Rivers of Rockingham County, New Hampshire
Rivers of New Hampshire